Yeongcheon station is a railway station in the city of Yeongcheon, North Gyeongsang Province, South Korea. It is on the Jungang Line and the Daegu Line.

External links
 Cyber station information from Korail

Railway stations in North Gyeongsang Province
Yeongcheon
Railway stations opened in 1918
Cultural Heritage of early modern times of South Korea